These are the official results of the Men's 50 km Walk event at the 1995 World Championships held on Thursday 10 August 1995 in Gothenburg, Sweden. There were a total number of 41 participating athletes.

Medalists

Abbreviations
All times shown are in hours:minutes:seconds

Intermediates

Final

See also
 1992 Men's Olympic 50km Walk (Barcelona)
 1993 Men's World Championships 50km Walk (Stuttgart)
 1994 Men's European Championships 50km Walk (Helsinki)
 1996 Men's Olympic 50km Walk (Atlanta)
 1997 Men's World Championships 50km Walk (Athens)

References
 Results
 Results at World Athletics

W
Racewalking at the World Athletics Championships